The Irish Alliance for Europe was founded in summer 2002 by Professor Brigid Laffan of University College Dublin in order to lead the civil society campaign in favour of the Treaty of Nice at the second Irish referendum. Adrian Langan was recruited as full-time Campaign Director from a similar, voluntary, position in Ireland for Europe. It led all sectors of Irish society, campaigning effectively through the mass media, local canvassing, and postering nationwide. 

In late 2007, the organisation was resurrected by Ruairi Quinn TD and former European Movement Ireland CEO, Brendan Kiely in order to campaign on the Lisbon Treaty referendum.

External links

Irish Alliance for Europe
Ireland for Europe

Political movements
Politics of the Republic of Ireland